A by-election for the seat of Canterbury in the New South Wales Legislative Assembly was held on 19 April 1884 because of the resignation of William Pigott due to ill health.

Dates

Results

William Pigott resigned.

See also
Electoral results for the district of Canterbury
List of New South Wales state by-elections

References

1884 elections in Australia
New South Wales state by-elections
1880s in New South Wales